Ardeuil-et-Montfauxelles is a commune in the Ardennes department in the Grand Est region of northern France.

The inhabitants of the commune are known as Ardeuillais or Ardeuillaises

Geography
Ardeuil-et-Montfauxelles is located 25 km south of Vouziers and 16 km east by north-east of Sommepy-Tahure on the border with the Marne department, which border forms the southern border of the commune. Access is by road D6 from Manre in the west, passing through the commune and the village before continuing east to Montcheutin. The smaller D121 road goes from the village north-east to join the D21 south-east of Challerange. Apart from the two villages of Ardeuil and Montfauxelles the commune is entirely farmland.

The Allin river flows through the commune from west to north-east. It joins the Aisne river at Brécy-Brières.

Neighbouring communes and villages

Administration

List of Successive Mayors

Demography
In 2017 the commune had 68 inhabitants. The population data given in the table and graph below for 1821 and earlier refer to the former commune of Ardeuil.

See also
Communes of the Ardennes department

References

External links
Ardeuil-et-Montfauxelles on the National Geographic Institute website 
Ardeuil-et-Montfauxelles on Géoportail, National Geographic Institute (IGN) website 
Ardeuil and Montfauxel on the 1750 Cassini Map

Communes of Ardennes (department)